The Miracle Club is an upcoming comedy film directed by Thaddeus O'Sullivan and starring Maggie Smith, Kathy Bates and Laura Linney.

Cast
Maggie Smith
Kathy Bates
Laura Linney
Stephen Rea
Agnes O'Casey

Production
The film was shot in Dublin and is in post production as of September 2022.

On March 1, 2023, it was announced that Sony Pictures Classics acquired the rights to the film in the U.S., Latin America and select territories in Southeast Asia and Eastern Europe.

References

External links
 

Upcoming films
Films shot in Dublin (city)
Films directed by Thaddeus O'Sullivan